Medvedivtsi may refer to these villages in the Ukraine.

 Medvedivtsi, Buchach Raion
 Medvedivtsi, Mukacheve Raion